Ağbulaq (also, Agbulak) is a village and municipality in the Tovuz Rayon of Azerbaijan.  It has a population of 266.

References 

Populated places in Tovuz District